Alexandre José de Oliveira Albuquerque (born 26 May 1977 in Recife), known simply as Alexandre, is a Brazilian retired footballer who played as a midfielder. He also possessed Spanish nationality, due to the many years spent in the country.

References

External links

1977 births
Living people
Naturalised citizens of Spain
Sportspeople from Recife
Brazilian footballers
Association football midfielders
Rosario Central footballers
Segunda División players
Segunda División B players
Villarreal CF players
Ciudad de Murcia footballers
Lorca Deportiva CF footballers
UD Alzira footballers
Belgian Pro League players
S.C. Eendracht Aalst players
Croatian Football League players
GNK Dinamo Zagreb players
Brazilian expatriate footballers
Expatriate footballers in Argentina
Expatriate footballers in Spain
Expatriate footballers in Belgium
Expatriate footballers in Croatia
Brazilian expatriate sportspeople in Argentina
Brazilian expatriate sportspeople in Spain
Brazilian expatriate sportspeople in Belgium
Brazilian expatriate sportspeople in Croatia